Peter Strasser (1 April 1876 – 5 August 1918) was chief commander of German Imperial Navy Zeppelins during World War I, the main force operating bombing campaigns from 1915 to 1917. He was killed when flying the German Empire's last airship raid over the United Kingdom.

Early career
Strasser was born in Hanover, Germany, on 1 April 1876. At the age of 15, he joined the German Imperial Navy (Kaiserliche Marine). After serving on board  SMS Stein and SMS Moltke, he entered the Naval academy in Kiel. He quickly rose through the ranks and was promoted to Lieutenant in 1895. He served  on board SMS Mars, SMS Blücher, SMS Panther, SMS Mecklenburg and SMS Westfalen from 1897 to 1902. He was an excellent gunnery officer and was placed in the German Imperial Naval Office (Reichsmarine-Amt) in charge of German shipboard and coastal artillery. In September 1913, he took command of the Naval Airship Division (Marine-Luftschiff-Abteilung). Airships were as yet an unproven technology and Korvettenkapitän Strasser became the new naval airship chief after his predecessor, Korvettenkapitän Friedrich Metzing, drowned in the crash of the very first naval airship, the L 1. Also the single remaining naval airship L 2 was soon lost in another fatal accident. Strasser completed theoretical studies on airships and gained practical experience piloting the civilian airship LZ 17 Sachsen. Another airship, LZ 13 Hansa was chartered to train naval crews while new ships were being built. At the start of the war Navy had only one airship operational, the LZ 24 (Navy designation L 3). L 3, under Strasser's personal command, was the only one to participate in the Imperial Navy manoeuvres just before the war.

First World War
Following the outbreak of World War I in August 1914, Navy airships were initially confined to anti-submarine, anti-mine and scouting missions. They served in the Battle of Heligoland Bight.

However, on 19–20 January 1915, L3 and L4 participated in the first bombing raids over England, attacking Great Yarmouth, Sheringham and King's Lynn. Over the next 3 years, bombing campaigns would be launched primarily against Britain, but also on Paris and other cities and ports. Strasser would participate in the England raids at least once a month. He decided to test the newly developed spy basket himself, and almost fell out when it became entangled with the Zeppelin's aerial. Initially, bombing was limited to military targets but with great lobbying support of Konteradmiral Paul Behncke, the Kaiser approved attacks against civilian targets. Official British estimates list 498 civilians and 58 soldiers killed by air attack in Britain between 1915 and 1918. 1,913 injuries are recorded. The Imperial Navy dropped 360,000 kg of bombs, the majority on the British Isles. 307,315 kg were directed at enemy vessels, ports and towns; 58,000 kg were dropped over Italy, the Baltic and the Mediterranean. German army airships carried 160,000 kg of bombs to their designated targets: 44,000 kg hit Belgium and France, 36,000 kg England, and 80,000 kg Russia and south eastern Europe. However, questions remain over whether airships (and more importantly, their irreplaceable crews) would have been better used as a purely naval weapon.

Vizeadmiral Reinhard Scheer became Strasser's superior in January 1916, and tried unsuccessfully to tame Strasser's aggressive pursuit of independence. On 28 November, 1916, Strasser was appointed by imperial decree as "Leader of Airships" (Führer der Luftschiffe; F.d.L.).

Death in the last raid over Great Britain
Strasser did not live to see the end of the war. On 5 August 1918, during a  night raid against Boston, Norwich, and the Humber Estuary, Strasser's L 70 met a British reconnaissance D.H.4. Pilot Major Egbert Cadbury and Gunner Major Robert Leckie shot down the L 70 just north of Wells-next-the-Sea on the Norfolk coast. None of the 23 men aboard survived. It proved to be the last airship raid over Great Britain.

Legacy
Strasser's impact on both the war and history was important for the future of air warfare. He was instrumental in the development of long range bombing and the development of the rigid airship as an efficient, high altitude, all-weather aircraft. He was a major proponent of the doctrine of bombing attacks on civilian as well as military targets, to serve both as propaganda and as a means of diverting resources from the front line.

Awards
 Iron Cross of 1914, 1st and 2nd class
 Pour le Mérite (20 August 1917)
 Hanseatic Cross of Hamburg
 Knight's Cross of the Royal House Order of Hohenzollern
 Order of the Red Eagle, 4th class
 Lifesaving Medal on Band

See also
Kaiserliche Marine
Schütte-Lanz
Total war
Zeppelin
List of Zeppelins

References

1876 births
1918 deaths
Military personnel from Hanover
People from the Province of Hanover
Military aviation leaders of World War I
German military personnel killed in World War I
Aviators killed by being shot down
Recipients of the Pour le Mérite (military class)
Imperial German Navy personnel of World War I
German airship aviators